In church architecture, sedilia (plural of Latin sedīle, "seat") are seats, usually made of stone, found on the liturgical south side of an altar, often in the chancel, for use during Mass for the officiating priest and his assistants, the deacon and sub-deacon. The seat is often set back into the main wall of the church itself.

Not all sedilia are stone; there is a timber one thought to be 15th century in St Nicholas' Church at Rodmersham in Kent.

When there is only one such seat, the singular form sedile is used, as for instance at St Mary's, Princes Risborough, Buckinghamshire or at St Agatha's, Coates, West Sussex.

The first examples in the catacombs were single inlays for the officiating priest. In time, the more usual number became three, although there are examples of up to five sedilia.

The custom of recessing them in the thickness of the wall began about the end of the 12th century; some early examples consist only of stone benches, and there is one instance of a single seat or arm-chair in stone at Lenham in Kent.

The niches or recesses into which they are sunk are often richly decorated with canopies and subdivided with moulded shafts, pinnacles and tabernacle work; the seats are sometimes at different levels, the eastern being always the highest, and sometimes an additional niche is provided in which the piscina is placed.

Three seats 
During certain sections of the liturgy, especially Gloria and Credo, the clergy sat in the three-seater (also Levite's seat, bench, chair, celebrant's chair) when the Mass was celebrated as the Levitical office of priest, deacon and subdeacon. Since the Second Vatican Council, celebrating the Mass as a "Levite ministry" has only been customary in the extraordinary form of the Roman Rite.

Function, location and types 
The location of the three seats is the south wall (right side, epistle side) of the chancel near the high altar. Here the oldest, niche-shaped three seats made of stone in the bond of the chancel wall are still preserved. In later examples, the turret architecture of the canopies above the seats takes on a life of their own. From the 14th century onwards, it was predominantly wooden furniture whose constructions formally approximate those of the choir stalls with their side walls, rear walls and roofing. But in contrast to these, three-seaters usually have no row of desks and no folding seats. In rare cases, three seats were not erected as Levite chairs for the liturgical actors, but rather as seats of honor and are then more likely to be found at the western end of the chancel.

Examples of sedilia

References

Bibliography 

 James Alexander Cameron, “From Hole-in-the-Wall to Heavenly Mansions: The Microarchitectural Development of Sedilia in Thirteenth-Century England”, in Jean-Marie Guillouët and Ambre Vilain (eds.), Microarchitectures médiévales. L'échelle à l'épreuve de la matière, Paris, INHA/Picard, 2018 (ISBN 978-2-7084-1042-8).

Church architecture